Maytenus microcarpa is a species of plant in the family Celastraceae. It is endemic to Jamaica.

References

microcarpa
Vulnerable plants
Endemic flora of Jamaica
Taxonomy articles created by Polbot
Taxobox binomials not recognized by IUCN